Zanjan rug or Zenjan rug is the handmade Iranian carpet from  Zanjan.

See also
Heriz rug
Tabriz rug

References

Persian rugs and carpets
Iranian culture
Zanjan Province